Gilzean is a surname from Scotland. Notable people with the surname include:

Footballers
Alan Gilzean (1938–2018), mostly played for Dundee, Tottenham
Ian Gilzean (born 1969), played for various clubs

Politicians
Andrew Gilzean, Labour Party politician
Hugh Reid (Liberal politician), Scottish journalist and politician

Other
Solomon Grundy (comics), or Butch Gilzean, supervillian in the DC Comics universe

Scottish surnames